Mycobacterium orygis is a species of the tuberculosis complex of the genus Mycobacterium. It causes tuberculosis in oryx, rhinos, dairy cattle, rhesus monkeys, and humans.

Morphology 
Mycobacterium orygis is similar in morphology to species in the tuberculosis complex of Mycobacterium. It is a non-motile, acid fast bacterium. The cell walls are composed primarily of Mycolic acids. The cells are irregular rods, 0.3–0.5 um in diameter and 2–3 um in length.

Metabolism 
Mycobacterium orygis is an obligate aerobe, and a facultative intracellular pathogen. It has a doubling time of 15–20 hours within cells, and longer when outside cells. Mycobacterium orygis uses the host's cells internal fatty acids for both a carbon source and an energy source. These molecules include cholesterol, triacylglycerides, and glycosphingolipids. The optimum growing range for this species is 32 degrees Celsius.

Genome 
Strain 51145, obtained from a human diagnosed with tuberculosis meningitis in 1997, has a 4.4 Mbp genome, 4032 genes and a GC content of 65.6%.

Causative agent of tuberculosis 
This species is a pathogen of oryx, deer, dairy cattle, rhesus monkeys, and humans. It is internationally spread as of 2021. It is a threat to the greater one-horned rhinoceros, which is considered vulnerable by the ICUN. It can present as respiratory and neurological disease, and forms granulomas which can cause severe health problems and death.

References

Wikipedia Student Program
Mycobacteria
Tuberculosis
Bovine diseases